Barraud is a surname. Notable people with the surname include:

Aimé Barraud (1902–1954), Swiss painter
Ali Barraud (1918–2015), Burkinabé politician
Charles Decimus Barraud (1822-1897), English-born New Zealand artist
Cyril Henry Barraud (1877-1965), English artist
Francis Barraud (1856-1924), English painter
Francis Philip Barraud, (1824-1900), English designer working in stained glass
François Barraud (1899–1934), Swiss painter
George Barraud (1889-1970), British film actor
Henry Barraud (composer) (1900–1997), French composer
Henry Barraud (artist) (1811-1874), English portrait, subject and animal painter
Herbert Rose Barraud (1845-c.1896), English portrait photographer
Philip James Barraud (1879–1948), English entomologist
Sarah Maria Barraud (1823-1895), English-born New Zealand letter-writer
William Barraud (1810–1850), English animal painter and illustrator